5'-3' Exoribonuclease 2 (XRN2) also known as Dhm1-like protein is an exoribonuclease enzyme that in humans is encoded by the XRN2 gene.

The human gene encoding XRN2 shares similarity with the mouse Dhm1 and the yeast's Dhp1 (Schizosaccharomyces pombe) or RAT1 (Saccharomyces) genes. The yeast gene is involved in homologous recombination and RNA metabolism, such as RNA synthesis and RNA trafficking and termination. Complementation studies show that Dhm1 has a similar function in mouse as Dhp1.

Function
Human XRN2 is involved in the torpedo model of transcription termination.

The C. elegans homologue, XRN-2, is involved in the degradation of certain mature miRNAs and their dislodging from miRISC miRNAs.

In yeast, the Rat1 protein has been shown to also be involved in the torpedo transcription termination model. When a polyadenylation site has been detected on the nascent RNA and cleaved by the RNA polymerase II, the Rtt103 factor recruits Rat1 and attaches it to free end. The exonuclease activity of Rat1 degrades the RNA strand and halts transcriptions upon catching up to the polymerase.

See also
 Xrn1

References

External links

Further reading

External links
 

Human proteins
EC 3.1.13